Emiliano Bonazzoli (born 20 January 1979) is a former Italian footballer who played as a striker.

Club career 
Bonazzoli started his career at Brescia. He played his first professional match on 15 May 1997 against Lecce, which his only match of the season the Serie B Champion. In the next two seasons he occasionally played for the first team and youth team. In second half of 1998–99 season, he left for league rival Cesena.

Bonazzoli was signed by Parma in a co-ownership deal in 1999. He was loaned back to Brescia and scored 9 league goals for the team.

Parma
In June 2000, Parma decided bought all remain registration rights from Brescia. He played the opening match on 1 October 2000, then left on loan to league rival Verona.

Bonazzoli returned to Parma and played  seasons for the team.

Reggina
Bonazzoli was sent on loan to Reggina in January 2003. At the end of season the club signed him in a co-ownership deal, for €925,000.

Sampdoria
In summer 2005, he was loaned to Sampdoria along with Marco Zamboni, which Bonazzoli secured a permanent move from Parma and Reggina in summer 2006. He suffered from injuries and at the start of 2007–08 Serie A, Andrea Caracciolo was signed to replace him.

He scored 4 goals in a UEFA Cup match for Sampdoria, on 14 January 2009, he was loaned to Fiorentina in exchange for Giampaolo Pazzini.

Return to Reggina
In July 2009 he signed a contract with Reggina in order to seek more regular start. He only valued €850,000 at that time.

He was excluded from the squad for the start of the 2012–13 Serie B season.

Padova
In November 2012 he joined Calcio Padova, which became official at the start of the January transfer window.

Marano
In September 2013, Bonazzoli was signed by the Serie D club, S.S.D. Calcio Marano.

Budapest Honvéd
In January 2014, Bonazzoli was signed by the Hungarian League club, Budapest Honvéd FC.

Este
In July 2014, Bonazzoli was signed by the Hungarian League club, A.C. Este.

Miami Fusion
In May 2015, Bonazzoli was signed by the National Premier Soccer League club, Miami Fusion FC.

Siena
In July 2015, Bonazzoli was signed by the Lega Pro club, Siena.

Cittadella
On 29 December 2015 Bonazzoli was signed by fellow third level club Cittadella after being released by Siena.

International career 
Bonazzoli was a member of Italy's U-18 team (now called U19 team) at the 1996 UEFA European Under-18 Championship Final tournament, the Italy U-21 team that won the 2002 European Under-21 Football Championship. He was first called up for the Italy squad in September 2006 for Euro 2008 qualifying qualification matches against Lithuania and France, but did not play in any of those. He finally made his international debut in a friendly against Turkey on 15 November 2006.

Honours
Brescia
Serie B: 1996–97

Parma
Coppa Italia: 2001–02

References

External links
 National Team stats.

1979 births
Living people
People from Asola, Lombardy
Italian footballers
Association football forwards
Italy youth international footballers
Italy under-21 international footballers
Italy international footballers
Brescia Calcio players
A.C. Cesena players
Parma Calcio 1913 players
Hellas Verona F.C. players
Reggina 1914 players
U.C. Sampdoria players
ACF Fiorentina players
Calcio Padova players
Budapest Honvéd FC players
Serie A players
Serie B players
Serie C players
Serie D players
Nemzeti Bajnokság I players
Italian expatriate footballers
Expatriate footballers in Hungary
Italian expatriate sportspeople in Hungary
Sportspeople from the Province of Mantua
Footballers from Lombardy
Serie A (women's football) managers